The Pennsylvania Consolidated Statutes are the official compilation of session laws enacted by the Pennsylvania General Assembly. Pennsylvania is undertaking its first official codification process. It is published by the Pennsylvania Legislative Reference Bureau (PALRB or LRB).

List of Titles 
There are several titles that compose the Consolidated Statutes:

See also
 Purdon's Pennsylvania Statutes
 Laws of Pennsylvania
 Law of Pennsylvania
 United States Code

References

External links
 Consolidated Statutes of Pennsylvania from the Pennsylvania General Assembly
 Unconsolidated Statutes of Pennsylvania from the Pennsylvania General Assembly
 Consolidated and Unconsolidated Statutes of Pennsylvania from FindLaw

Government of Pennsylvania
Pennsylvania law
United States state legal codes